Svalbard and Jan Mayen (ISO 3166-1 alpha-2: SJ, ISO 3166-1 alpha-3: SJM, ISO 3166-1 numeric: 744) is a statistical designation defined by ISO 3166-1 for a collective grouping of two remote jurisdictions of Norway: Svalbard and Jan Mayen. While the two are combined for the purposes of the International Organization for Standardization (ISO) category, they are not administratively related. This has further resulted in the country code top-level domain  being issued for Svalbard and Jan Mayen, and ISO 3166-2:SJ. The United Nations Statistics Division also uses this code, but has named it the Svalbard and Jan Mayen Islands.

Svalbard is an archipelago in the Arctic Ocean under the sovereignty of Norway, but is subject to the special status granted by the Svalbard Treaty. Jan Mayen is a remote island in the Arctic Ocean; it has no permanent population and is administered by the County Governor of Nordland. Svalbard and Jan Mayen have in common that they are the only integrated parts of Norway not allocated to counties. 

While a separate ISO code for Svalbard was proposed by the United Nations, it was the Norwegian authorities who took initiative to include Jan Mayen in the code. Its official language is Norwegian.

Constituents

Svalbard 

Svalbard is an archipelago in the Arctic about midway between mainland Norway and the North Pole. The group of islands range from 74° to 81° north latitude, and from 10° to 35° east longitude. Spitsbergen is the largest island, followed by Nordaustlandet and Edgeøya. The administrative center is Longyearbyen, and other settlements, in addition to research outposts, are the Russian mining community of Barentsburg, the research community of Ny-Ålesund and the mining outpost of Sveagruva.

The Svalbard Treaty of 1920 recognizes Norwegian sovereignty, and the 1925 Svalbard Act made Svalbard a full part of the Kingdom of Norway. The archipelago is administered by the Governor of Svalbard, which is subordinate to the Norwegian Ministry of Justice and Public Security. Unlike the rest of Norway (including Jan Mayen), Svalbard is a free economic zone and a demilitarized zone, and is not part of the Schengen Area nor the European Economic Area.

Jan Mayen 

Jan Mayen is a volcanic island in the Arctic Ocean located at the border of the Norwegian Sea and the Greenland Sea. The island's only population is a combined military and meteorological outpost that operated a LORAN-C transmitter at Olonkinbyen. The Norwegian Meteorological Institute annexed the island for Norway in 1922. On 27 February 1930, the island was made de jure a part of the Kingdom of Norway. Since 1994, the island has been administered by the County Governor of Nordland, with some authority delegated to the station commander. Before 1994, the Governor of Svalbard administered Jan Mayen.

Application 

The ISO designation is congruent with an equivalent United Nations Statistics Division category and users of these classification systems may in some cases report separately for "Svalbard and Jan Mayen Islands" instead of rolling up this information into the "Norway" category. Neither Svalbard nor Jan Mayen have their own flag or coat of arms, and the flag of Norway is used for both of them, both alone and as a group.

An attempt to change the ISO code to just "Svalbard" has previously failed because of opposition from the Norwegian Ministry of Foreign Affairs. However, for statistics use within population and trade, "Svalbard and Jan Mayen" essentially means just "Svalbard".

ISO 3166-2 

ISO 3166-2:SJ is the entry for Svalbard and Jan Mayen in ISO 3166-2, a system for assigning codes to subnational administrative divisions. However, further subdivision for Svalbard and Jan Mayen occurs under Norway's entry, ISO 3166-2:NO:
  Svalbard
  Jan Mayen

The hierarchical administrative subdivision codes for Svalbard is SJ.SV and for Jan Mayen is SJ.JM.

Top-level domain 

By virtue of the ISO 3166-1 alpha-2 code SJ, Svalbard and Jan Mayen were grouped together and allocated the Internet country code top-level domain (ccTLD) . Norid, who also administered the Norway's  ccTLD, was given the responsibility for the .sj and Bouvet Island's  domain in 1997. Policy prohibits any registration with either of the domains, as institutions connected to Svalbard can use the  domain. Norwegian authorities do not want to commercialize the domain resources, and therefore  will not be sold to a third party.

References

Bibliography 
 
 

Geography of Jan Mayen
Geography of Svalbard
Concession territories